Wormerland is a municipality in the Netherlands, in the province of North Holland.

Population centres 
The municipality of Wormerland consists of the following cities, towns, villages and/or districts: 

It borders the municipalities of:

Local government 
The municipal council of Wormerland consists of 17 seats, which are divided as follows:
 PvdA - 4 - 25,21% - 1842 votes
 GroenLinks - 4 - 19,86% - 1451 votes
 Liberaal WL - 3 - 21,09% - 1541 votes
 VVD - 3 - 17,13% - 1252 votes
 CDA - 3 - 16,71% - 1221 votes

Sport facilities 
Soccer clubs:
 WSV'30 (Wormer Sport Vereniging 1930) - Wormer
 VV Jisp - Jisp
 VV Knollendam - Oostknollendam
 DZS (De Zilveren Schapen) - Neck/Wijdewormer
 PSCK (Parochiële Sport Club Kalf) - Kalf (Located in Wijdewormer)
 ZCFC (Zaandamse Christelijke Football club) - Zaandam  (Located in Wijdewormer)

Notable people 

 Tyman Arentsz. Cracht (ca.1590/1600 – 1646) painter who specialized in landscapes and history paintings
 Ewald Kooiman (1938–2009) organist and professor of Romance languages
 Martin Bosma (born 1964) politician and former journalist

Sport 
 Klaas de Groot (1919–1994) wrestler, competed at the 1948 Summer Olympics
 Cees Gravesteijn (born 1928) sprint canoer, competed at the 1948 Summer Olympics
 Dick Wayboer (born 1936) a sailor, competed at the 1964 Summer Olympics
 Piet de Wit (born 1946) retired cyclist and former local bicycle shop owner
 Arend Bloem (born 1947) sprint canoer who competed at the 1976 Summer Olympics
 Pieter Jan Leeuwerink (1962–2004) volleyball player, competed at the 1988 Summer Olympics

Gallery

References

External links

Official website

 
Municipalities of North Holland